Hexa(tert-butoxy)ditungsten(III) is a coordination complex of tungsten(III).  It is one of the homoleptic alkoxides of tungsten.  A red, air-sensitive solid, the complex has attracted academic attention as the precursor to many organotungsten derivatives.  It an example of a charge-neutral complex featuring a W≡W bond, arising from the coupling of a pair of d3 metal centers. It has attracted particular attention for its reactions with alkynes, leading to alkyne metathesis.

It can be prepared by the salt metathesis reaction from the thf complex of ditungsten heptachloride:
NaW2Cl7(THF)5  +  6 NaOBu-t  →  W2(OBu-t)6  +  7 NaCl  +  5 THF
It was originally prepared by alcoholysis of the amide W2(NMe2)6.

The complex and its dimolybdenum analogue adopt a staggered, ethane-like conformation. The M-M distance is 233 pm.  The complex is a weak Lewis acid, forming adducts with two pyridine ligands, for example.

See also
Hexa(tert-butoxy)dimolybdenum(III)

References

Alkoxides
Tungsten compounds